Kattimannap Qurlua, formerly Wilberforce Falls, is an almost  tall waterfall located in the Wilberforce Gorge of the Hood River in Nunavut, Canada. The falls are one of the few major waterfalls in the world north of the Arctic Circle.

Name
The waterfall was originally named for William Wilberforce, an English politician and leader of the movement to abolish the slave trade. In 2020 the name of the falls was changed to Kattimannap Qurlua.

See also
List of waterfalls of Canada

References

External links
Panoramic view of the falls from the northwest, August 2017

Waterfalls of Nunavut